Asiedu is both a surname and a given name. Notable people with the name include:

Surname 
Elizabeth Asiedu, Ghanaian-born American economist
Joseph Richard Asiedu, Ghanaian judge and politician

Middle name 

 Johnson Asiedu Nkatie, Ghanaian politician

Given name 
Asiedu Attobrah (born 1995), Ghanaian professional footballer
Asiedu Yirenkyi (1942–2018), Ghanaian playwright